Hasan Predojević ( 1530 – 22 June 1593), also known as Telli Hasan Pasha, was the fifth Ottoman beylerbey (vali) of Bosnia and a notable Ottoman Bosnian military commander, who led an invasion of the Habsburg Kingdom of Croatia during the Ottoman wars in Europe. From July to October 1592, Hasan-paša Predojević led devastating raids into Slavonia, Bohemia, Croatia, and Hungary resulting in the capture of 35,000 people and the enslavement and death of more than 20,000 people.

Early life
He was born Nikola Predojević into the Predojević clan, of either Serb or Vlach ethnic background, from Eastern Herzegovina. According to Muvekkit Hadžihuseinović he was born in Lušci Palanka, in the Bosanska Krajina region, however, according to his nickname Hersekli, he was from Herzegovina. The birthplace has been given specifically as Bijela Rudina, Bileća. His family originated from Klobuk. 

An Ottoman sultan wrote in a book that he had requested from a notable lord in Herzegovina, named Predojević, that 30 small Serb children (including Predojević's only son Jovan, and his nephew Nikola) to be sent to Ottoman service (see devshirme). The very young Nikola was then taken to Constantinople as acem-i oğlan (foreign child) and brought up in the Sultan's court, and was forced to convert to Islam, adopting the name Hasan and advancing to the post of çakircibaşa (chief falconer and commander of falconers in the Sultan's court).

After having been appointed Beglerbeg of Bosnia, Telli Hasan Pasha had the Rmanj Monastery renewed as a seat of his brother, Serbian Orthodox monk Gavrilo Predojević. He also founded a mosque in Polje, Grabovica, in the Bileća municipality.

Ottoman service

Sanjak-bey of Segedin

During the rule of Murad III (1574–1595) he became Sanjak-bey of the Sanjak of Segedin, where he stayed until June 1591.

Beylerbey of Bosnia

He was elevated and appointed Beglerbeg (Governor-General) of the Bosnia Eyalet in 1591. A bellicose and dynamic military leader, Hasan strengthened the army of the Eyalet equipping it with better horses and erecting a bridge at Gradiška with the purpose of easier maneuvering between Bosnia and Slavonia.

In August 1591, without a declaration of war, Hasan Pasha attacked Habsburg Croatia and reached Sisak, but was repelled after 4 days of fighting. Thomas Erdődy, the Ban of Croatia, launched a counterattack and seized much of the Moslavina region. The same year Hasan Pasha launched another attack, taking the town of Ripač on the Una River. These raids forced the Ban to declare a general uprising to defend the country in late January 1592. These actions of the Ottoman regional forces under Hasan Pasha seem to have been contrary to the interest and policy of the central Ottoman administration in Constantinople, and due rather to aims of conquest and organized plundering by the war-like Bosnian sipahi, although perhaps also under the pretext of putting an end to Uskok (Balkan Habsburg-sided pirates and bandits engaged in guerrilla warfare against the Ottomans) raids into the Eyalet; since the two realms had signed a nine-year peace treaty earlier in 1590. Hasan Pasha's forces of approximately 20,000 janissaries continued to raid the region, with the goal of seizing the strategically important town of Senj and its port, and to eliminate the Uskoci; because all of this, the Holy Roman Emperor sent his ambassador so he would beg that Hasan Pasha be removed from his post, or otherwise an end would be put to the existing truce. The ambassador was told in reply, that it belonged to the Grand Vizier and to Derviš-paša, the Sultan's favourite, to repel their aggressions against the Ottoman Empire; that, the imperial ambassador was told, was a sufficient answer. After learning this, Hasan Pasha felt himself encouraged enough to lead his forces towards Bihać, which was conquered on 19 June 1592 after eight days of siege, along with several surrounding forts. Records show that nearly 2,000 people died in defense of the town, and an estimated 800 children were taken for Ottoman servitude (see devshirme), 
to be educated in Islam and become janissaries, as Hasan had been himself. After having placed a sufficient garrison in Bihać, he erected two other fortresses in its vicinity; the command of which he conferred to Rustem-beg, who was the leader of the Grand Vizier  Ferhad Pasha's militia. In all, during this two-year campaign, the Ottoman Bosnian regional invading forces, led by Hasan Pasha, burned to the ground 26 cities throughout the Croatian Frontier and took some 35,000 war captives. At the same time, at Predojević's order, Orthodox Serbs were settled in the "whole region around Bihać" from 1592 to 1593. Predojevic fully relied on Vlachs, recruiting them specially for his army; according to an official report, in 1593, after the fall of Bihać, Vlachs were, at Hasan's order, settled in the areas around Brekovica, Ripač, Ostrvica, and Vrla Draga up to Sokolac, while Orthodox Vlachs from Eastern Herzegovina, and with them some Turkish and Bosnian Muslim aristocratic feudal landlords as well, were settled in the same areas, in such numbers that they formed a significant population of this region.

At first, Telli Hasan Pasha's troops met little resistance, allowing them to capture numerous Uskoci settlements, where they enslaved or slaughtered the entire population and burned the settlements. His forces soon besieged and captured Senj and exterminated the Uskoci population. For his successes, the Pasha was awarded the title of "Vizier" by the Sultan. However, the following year, Telli Hasan Pasha decided to advance further into Croatia. His force of some twenty-thousand was soundly defeated in his third attempt to conquer Sisak, in the battle that took place near by that fortified town, in which Hasan Pasha is generally reported to have died, alongside his brother Džafer Bey (governor of the Sanjak of Pakrac-Cernica), Mehmed Pasha (the sultan's nephew and governor of the Sanjak of Herzegovina), Arpadi Bey (governor of the Sanjak of Klis-Livno), and many other Turkish and Bosnian Muslim Pashas, Beys and Aghas, who accompanied the Vizier in his campaign, having been routed. According to Mustafa Naima: "The brave Hasan Pasha himself also met with his fate, having fallen into the river with one of the bridges which had been cut to prevent the pursuit of the enemy. Such was the result of this terrible day." Indeed, after he had drowned in the river, his dress was taken as a trophy to Ljubljana where it was remade into the sacerdotal coat worn by the bishop during the celebration of the Thanksgiving mass.

Aftermath and legacy
A monastery was built on the location of his grave, after requests of a Predojević to Sultan Murad, who also granted Kolunić and Smiljan (metochion). Safvet-beg Bašagić praises him as a meritorious general and statesman, as well as a great and fearless hero.

Annotations

References

Bibliography 

 

16th-century Ottoman military personnel
Pashas
Bosnia and Herzegovina Sunni Muslims
Ottoman governors of Bosnia
1530 births
1593 deaths
Ottoman military personnel killed in action
Converts to Islam from Eastern Orthodoxy
Former Serbian Orthodox Christians
Generals of the medieval Islamic world
People of the Long Turkish War
Bosnian Muslims from the Ottoman Empire
16th-century Eastern Orthodox Christians
 Eastern Romance people